At All Costs may refer to:
 At All Costs (Weber novel), a 2005 novel by David Weber
 At All Costs (Nancy Drew/Hardy Boys novel), 1997
 At All Costs (film), a 2016 documentary film